Major A. K. Raveendran SM (born 13 June 1958) is a retired officer of the Indian Army and former National Security Guard commando. He was awarded the President's gallantry medal in 1991 and 1992 for his contributions in fighting terrorism in Punjab and Kashmir. After retiring from the army, he began his career in Indian cinema as a consultant for military-based films. He made his independent directorial debut in 2006 with Keerthi Chakra for which he won the Kerala State Film Award for Best Screenplay.

Family 
Major Ravi was born to P. Kuttisankaran Nair, who was a soldier in the Indian Army and A. T. Satyabhama. He is married to Anitha. The couple has a son Arjun Ravi.

Military career 
He joined the army after his schooling and later pursued his studies within the army and graduated from the Army Cadet College to become an officer in Dec 1984. He served in the Indian Army as a commando in the National Security Guards, as Aide-de-camp (ADC) to the then chief of Indian Army General Sunith Francis Rodrigues PVSM, VSM and as an officer in the Indian Military Intelligence in the Andaman and Nicobar islands and Jammu and Kashmir. He was head of the mission code-named Operation One Eyed Jack to capture suspects of the Rajiv Gandhi assassination (the assassination of Rajiv Gandhi by Thenmozhi Rajaratnam on 21 May 1991 at Sriperumbudur in Tamil Nadu). His military tenure of four years in the National Security Guard as a commando inspired him to direct Keerthi Chakra (2006) and Mission 90 Days (2007). At the time of his retirement from the Indian Army, his rank was Major.

Film career 
After serving for about two decades in the Indian Army, he became a military consultant for Indian films. He has worked with Indian film makers Priyadarshan, Rajkumar Santoshi, Kamal Haasan, and Mani Ratnam. He made a children's film, Toofan in Hindi in 1999, starring Dileep and Saba Khan, which had a delayed release in 2010, due to censoring issues. It was dubbed into Malayalam as Oru Avadhikaalam. His first feature film was Keerti Chakra, a film on Kashmir militancy.

His second movie Mission 90 Days was his own experience of the mission to capture the suspects of Rajiv Gandhi murder case. His third project Kurukshetra based on the Kargil war starring Mohanlal was a sequel to Keerthi Chakra. The 2010 film Kandahar was a third installment to the Major Mahadevan film series.

In 2012, he directed Karma Yodha with  Mohanlal. In 2015, Picket 43, starring Prithviraj and Javed Jaffery was made. It turned out to be a hit. He is now heading towards a fourth installment in the Major Mahadevan series. About the film he quoted: "The focus will be on the individuals rather than the war, and will portray the relationships that are forged during the war."

Filmography

Television

Awards 
Sena Medal

Kerala State Film Awards
 2006: Best Screen Play - Keerthi Chakra

 Asianet Film Awards
 2006: Best Director Award - Keerthi Chakra
 2008: Special Honour Jury Award - Kurukshetra
2010: Best Feature Film on National Integration Award - Kandahar

References 

Kerala State Film Award winners
Living people
Military personnel from Kerala
Malayalam film directors
Male actors from Kerala
Male actors in Malayalam cinema
1958 births
People from Palakkad district
Indian Army officers
20th-century Indian male actors
Indian male film actors
Film directors from Kerala
21st-century Indian film directors
21st-century Indian male actors